Open Roads is an upcoming mystery-thriller video game developed by Fullbright and published by Annapurna Interactive. The game is scheduled to be released for Microsoft Windows, PlayStation 4, PlayStation 5 and Xbox Series X/S. It was initially announced at The Game Awards on December 10, 2020.

It stars Keri Russell and Kaitlyn Dever in the leading voice roles.

Gameplay 
"Open Roads utilizes a unique and engaging interactive dialogue system that moves the narrative along, exposing character flaws, secrets, and buried truths".

Plot 
Open Roads stars actors Keri Russell and Kaitlyn Dever as a mother-daughter duo on a road trip where they learn more than they bargained for.

References

External links 
 Official Website
 Open Roads on Steam

Upcoming video games
Adventure games
Annapurna Interactive games
Art games
Mystery video games
Indie video games
PlayStation 4 games
PlayStation 5 games
Xbox Series X and Series S games
Single-player video games
Video games developed in the United States
Video games featuring female protagonists
Windows games
Xbox One games